Fleming Island may refer to:

Canada
 Fleming Island (New Brunswick), in Nova Scotia
 Fleming Island (Manitoulin), in the Manitoulin region of Ontario 
 Fleming Island (Saskatchewan), in Saskatchewan
 Fleming Island (British Columbia) in British Columbia
 Fleming Island (Leeds) in the Leeds region of Ontario 

United States
 Fleming Island, Florida, a community in Florida